"Against All Odds (Take a Look at Me Now)" (also titled "Against All Odds") is a song by English drummer, singer and songwriter Phil Collins. It was recorded for the soundtrack to the 1984 film of the same name. It is a power ballad in which its protagonist implores an ex-lover to "take a look at me now," knowing that reconciliation is "against all odds," but worth the gamble. The single reached No. 1 on the Billboard Hot 100 in the United States, the first of seven US No. 1's for Collins in his solo career. "Against All Odds (Take a Look At Me Now)" also topped the charts in Canada, Ireland, and Norway, while peaking at No. 2 in the United Kingdom.

The song has been covered by several singers, some versions of which have been successful in both the US and UK markets. The song has twice reached No. 1 in the UK singles chart: the pairing of Mariah Carey and boyband Westlife, in September 2000, and then again by Steve Brookstein, the first winner of The X Factor, in January 2005.

Phil Collins version

Background, writing and recording
Collins was approached to write the title song to the film Against All Odds while it was still in its preliminary "rough cut form". At the time the soundtrack was being completed, Collins was on tour with Genesis. Director Taylor Hackford flew into Chicago to see one of the band's concerts. Collins watched the movie on a videocassette recorder in his hotel room and agreed to appear on the soundtrack.

Originally titled "How Can You Just Sit There?", the song's music was written by Collins during sessions for his debut solo album Face Value (1981), but it fell by the wayside as it was his least favourite of the several ballads he wrote at the time. Neither was it included on Hello, I Must Be Going!, as many newer songs were written for it. Eventually, Collins presented the demo to Taylor Hackford when approached to write a song for the Against All Odds movie, which he loved. Then Collins penned the lyrics, which were for the film. Due to lack of time available (as he was on tour with Genesis), he had arranger Arif Mardin produce it, and they worked on it over two days. The piano performance is by New York musician Rob Mounsey. Piano, keyboard bass and a string section arranged and conducted by Mardin were recorded at RCA Studios, New York, while Collins recorded vocals and drums in Los Angeles.

On episode 339 of This American Life, "Break Up", Collins relays that the song was inspired and written shortly after the breakup between him and his first wife. In the interview he says that the divorce transformed him from being a musician into also being a lyricist.

The song was first included on a Collins album on the 1998 compilation Hits, and it also appeared on his compilation Love Songs: A Compilation... Old and New (2004). A live performance of the song also appears on the Serious Hits... Live! album. In 2015, Collins released the original demo recording from the Face Value sessions as part of his Take A Look At Me Now project.

Use and association with the film
"Against All Odds" was created explicitly for the movie, although it was based on an earlier unreleased song Collins had written in 1981. Hackford, who previously used a song for the 1982 American drama film An Officer and a Gentleman, planned the same for the neo-noir 1984 film Against All Odds, which is a remake of Out of the Past. When he signed with Atlantic Records, he was provided with a roster of artists, among whom Collins was chosen to render the film's theme song based on the quality of his voice. Hackford said that it was a "textbook case of designing a song to reflect what the film is". The song appears in the movie as background music during the closing credits.

Writing for the soundtrack's review, Allmusic editor Heather Phares claimed that the film is best remembered for the inclusion of Collins' "classic theme song". Phares added that the song "remains not only one of Collins' definitive singles, but one of the 1980s' best love songs". Director Hackford also had the same view, stating that it "decidedly" helped the film: people identified the song with the film and came to watch it. When the single reached the top five, it contributed to the increased box office sales of the movie.

Reception
"Against All Odds" won the Grammy Award for Best Pop Vocal Performance, Male in 1985, was nominated for Song of the Year and for an Academy Award as well as for a Golden Globe both in the Best Original Song categories. At the Academy Awards ceremony, Collins was not invited to sing his song on stage and instead sat in the audience as dancer Ann Reinking gave a mostly lip-synced vocal performance accompanied by a dance routine. Reinking's performance was poorly received by critics from the Los Angeles Times and People, as well as by Collins himself in a Rolling Stone interview.

When another song Collins performed for a movie, "Separate Lives", was being nominated for an Academy Award, in interviews about the original snub by the academy for "Against All Odds", Collins would jokingly say "the hell with him - I'm going up too", referring to what he would do if the Stephen Bishop-written song were to win the award. Collins lost to the Stevie Wonder song "I Just Called to Say I Love You".

Rapper RZA named "Against All Odds" as his favourite power ballad in an article on such songs in Spin.

The Guardian and American Songwriter both named "Against All Odds (Take a Look at Me Now)" as Collins' second-best solo song behind "In the Air Tonight".

Commercial performance
"Against All Odds" became Collins' third top-ten single in the UK, peaking at #2 for three weeks in 1984. It was kept from the top spot by Lionel Richie's "Hello" for the first of these three weeks, and Duran Duran's "The Reflex" for the next two. It was ranked 14th in the year-end best-seller chart. In the U.S. and Canada, it peaked at No. 1 on the Billboard Hot 100 and RPM charts for three weeks in the spring of 1984. Billboard ranked it as the No. 5 song for 1984.

Music video
The single's music video was directed by Taylor Hackford, produced by Jeffrey Abelson through Parallax Productions and cinematographed by Daniel Pearl. Hackford was paid US$20,000 (out of a total budget of US$45,000) for a complete Collins clip. The music video was released in February 1984. A No. 1 MTV video for several weeks, MTV ranked it as No. 4 four in its 1984 year-end top 20 video countdown. Gary LeMel, music supervisor at Columbia, felt the music video on MTV increased Against All Odds box office takings by at least US$5 million.

The concept for the video was created by Keith Williams, a Welsh-born writer who had already worked with Abelson on the video for "Dancin' With Myself" (Billy Idol), and who would go on to also create concepts for "Holding Out for a Hero" (Bonnie Tyler) and "Ghostbusters" (Ray Parker Jr.) for the same producer as well as "Say You Say Me" (Lionel Richie) from White Nights, which Taylor Hackford also directed.

Charts

Weekly charts

Year-end charts

All-time charts

Credits
 Phil Collins – vocals, drums
 Rob Mounsey – acoustic piano, keyboards
 Arif Mardin – orchestrations and conductor

Certifications

Mariah Carey version

American singer Mariah Carey co-produced her version of the song with James Harris III and Terry Lewis for her seventh studio album Rainbow (1999). It was released on 29 May 2000, as the third single from the album, by Columbia Records. Carey co-produced the single edit of the song with Steve Mac.

Although the song was promoted as part of Rainbow in the United States, it was not released as a commercial or a radio single there. The song peaked at number two in Norway and Poland while reaching the top 20 in numerous European countries.

The music video for Carey's version of the song, directed by Paul Misbehoven, consists of a montage of clips of Carey singing the song from her various Rainbow World Tour stops to cullings from her Homecoming special.

Critical reception
Mariah Carey's cover of "Against All Odds (Take a Look at Me Now)" received positive reviews. Danyel Smith of Entertainment Weekly wrote: "Listeners with an eye on the tabloids could read her close, ringing interpretation of Phil Collins' 1984 hit, "Against All Odds (Take a Look at Me Now)," as a postmortem on her bittersweet affair with Yankee shortstop Derek Jeter and a poignant evocation of the couple's shared mixed-race heritage ("You're the only one who really knew me at all")." L.A. Times' Elysa Gardner called this cover "surprisingly faithful, forthright" and "she resists her tendency to over-embellish notes and focuses on what really matters: the melody and lyrics." MTV Asia editor Dara Cook wrote: "Mariah festoons herself in Phil Collins' 1980s melodic garb, appropriately pret a porter with overwrought emotion. She delicately ascends the sparely accompanied first verses—but alas, that damn drum roll soon sounds and the bouffant strings and vocal gymnastics ensue." Rolling Stone's Arion Berger was not happy with the cover selection which he called a "drippy Eighties power-pop hit."

Track listing
 12" single"Against All Odds (Take A Look At Me Now)" (Pound Boys Main Mix)" – 9:09
"Against All Odds (Take A Look At Me Now)" (Pound Boys Radio Edit)" – 3:37
"Against All Odds (Take A Look At Me Now)" (Pound Boys Deep Dub)" – 8:12
"Against All Odds (Take A Look At Me Now)" (Pound Boys Dub)" – 6:56

 CD single"Against All Odds (Take A Look At Me Now)" - 3:25
"Crybaby" – 5:19
"Thank God I Found You (Stargate Radio Edit)" – 4:21
"Can't Take That Away (Morales Club Mix Edit)" – 3:57

 Against All Odds (Take a Look at Me Now) EP"Against All Odds (Take A Look At Me Now)" (with Westlife) - 3:21
"Against All Odds (Take A Look At Me Now)" (Mariah Only) - 3:25
"Against All Odds (Take A Look At Me Now)" (Pound Boys Radio Edit) – 3:37
"Against All Odds (Take A Look At Me Now)" (Pound Boys Main Mix) – 9:09
"Against All Odds (Take A Look At Me Now)" (Pound Boys Deep Dub) – 8:12
"Against All Odds (Take A Look At Me Now)" (Pound Boys Dub) – 6:56

Charts

Weekly charts

Year-end charts

Release history

Mariah Carey and Westlife version

Carey rereleased the song in collaboration with Irish boyband Westlife. The song was released as the first single from the band's second album, Coast to Coast (2000). The song was released on 15 September 2000, following Carey's solo version. Carey's vocals from the solo version were retained for the duet, though the instrumental track was reproduced with a more organic sound complete with violins. The music video shows Carey and Westlife recording the song and exploring the island of Capri by boat.

The single debuted at number one in the United Kingdom, selling 112,000 copies. It remained at number one in its second week, selling a further 78,500 copies. The song became Carey's second to top the UK Singles Chart and Westlife's sixth consecutive number one. As of November 2021, the song has sold 507,000 copies in the country. It is Westlife's sixth biggest selling single (paid-for sales and combined sales categories) of all-time and their fifteenth most streamed single in the United Kingdom.

The song also spent two weeks at number one in Scotland and three in Ireland. It peaked at number three on the continental chart, European Hot 100 Singles. Due to its European success, the single is featured on the international editions of Carey's compilation albums Greatest Hits (2001) and #1 to Infinity (2015).

Track listings
 UK CD1 "Against All Odds" – 3:21
 "Against All Odds" (Pound Boys Main Mix) – 9:09
 "Against All Odds" (Mariah only version) – 3:21
 "Westlife Interview" (CD extra video version)

 UK CD2 "Against All Odds" – 3:21
 "Against All Odds" (Westlife only version) – 3:21
 "Against All Odds" (Pound Boys Dub) – 6:48
 "Against All Odds" (CD extra video version)

 UK cassette single "Against All Odds" – 3:21
 "Against All Odds" (Pound Boys radio edit) – 3:37

 Japanese CD single'''
 "Against All Odds" – 3:20
 "Against All Odds" (album version) – 3:26
 "Against All Odds" (Pound Boys radio edit) – 3:32
 "Against All Odds" (instrumental) – 3:20

Charts

Weekly charts

Year-end charts

Certifications

Release history

Steve Brookstein version

English singer and The X Factor winner Steve Brookstein included "Against All Odds" on his debut studio album, Heart and Soul (2005). It was released as his debut single on 20 December 2004 by Sony BMG.

Background
In 2004, Brookstein won the televised UK talent competition The X Factor, and recorded a cover of the Phil Collins 1984 hit "Against All Odds" as his debut single. It entered the UK Singles Chart at number two behind "Do They Know It's Christmas?" by Band Aid 20, and then climbed to number one, where it stayed for one week from 2 January 2005 to 8 January 2005 and was replaced by Elvis Presley's "Jailhouse Rock". "Against All Odds" was later included on Brookstein's debut album Heart and Soul.

Chart performance
"Against All Odds" debuted at number two in the United Kingdom, behind Band Aid 20's version of "Do They Know It's Christmas?", and at number 11 in Ireland. It charted at number one in the UK the following week. "Against All Odds" sold 127,701 copies in its first week in the UK, the lowest first-week sales for an X Factor winner's single until 2015. Brookstein's version has sold 204,000 copies in the UK to date, making it the lowest-selling X Factor winner's single. It has sold fewer than half the copies of Leon Jackson's "When You Believe" and Little Mix's "Cannonball", a third of Joe McElderry's "The Climb", a quarter of Leona Lewis's "A Moment Like This", and a fifth of those of Matt Cardle's "When We Collide", Shayne Ward's "That's My Goal", James Arthur's "Impossible" and Alexandra Burke's "Hallelujah". The next fewest sales from a winner's song was Sam Bailey's version of "Skyscraper", which had first-week sales of 149,000 copies, 26,000 more than "Against All Odds". However, Louisa Johnson, Matt Terry and Rak Su would all have lower first week sales in later years.

Track listing
 "Against All Odds" – 3:17
 "Smile" (The X Factor performance) – 1:55
 "Help Me Make It Through the Night" (The X Factor performance) – 2:00

Charts

Weekly charts

Year-end charts

In popular culture
Radio
The song also features heavily in the first act of the This American Life episode "Break Up". The segment featured an interview with Collins, as well as narration from a woman who listened to the song to get over a break-up and vowed to write her own break-up song.

Video games
A cover of the song by Deja Vu featuring Tasmin was featured in the 2001 game Dance Dance Revolution 5thMix for the Japanese arcade and PlayStation 2, and in the 2005 game Dance Dance Revolution Extreme 2'' for the North American PlayStation 2.

See also
List of Billboard Hot 100 number-one singles of 1984
List of number-one singles from the 2000s (UK)
List of number-one singles of 2000 (Ireland)

References

Bibliography

External links
 Lyrics of this song
 

1984 songs
1984 singles
2000 singles
2004 singles
Phil Collins songs
Mariah Carey songs
Westlife songs
Songs written by Phil Collins
Songs written for films
Song recordings produced by Arif Mardin
Song recordings produced by Jimmy Jam and Terry Lewis
Song recordings produced by Mariah Carey
Song recordings produced by Steve Mac
Billboard Hot 100 number-one singles
Cashbox number-one singles
Irish Singles Chart number-one singles
Number-one singles in Israel
Number-one singles in Norway
Number-one singles in Scotland
RPM Top Singles number-one singles
Grammy Award for Best Male Pop Vocal Performance
UK Singles Chart number-one singles
The X Factor (British TV series)
Atlantic Records singles
Columbia Records singles
Sony Music singles
RCA Records singles
Sony BMG singles
Bertelsmann Music Group singles
Pop ballads
Rock ballads
Torch songs
1980s ballads